Oliver Munson (March 2, 1856 – October 24, 1933) was a member of the Wisconsin State Senate.

Biography
Munson was born Oliver Goldsmith Munson in what is now Cresco, Iowa on March 2, 1856. He moved to Richland Center, Wisconsin in 1876 and to Viroqua, Wisconsin in 1885. In 1881, Munson married Josephine C. Downs. They had four children. Munson died in 1933.

Career
Munson was a member of the Senate from 1897 to 1908. Later, he was Chief Clerk of the Senate from 1915 to 1923 and again from 1927 to 1931. Previously, Munson was Clerk of Richland Center and a member of the Vernon County, Wisconsin Board of Supervisors. He was a Republican.

References

People from Cresco, Iowa
People from Richland Center, Wisconsin
People from Viroqua, Wisconsin
Employees of the Wisconsin Legislature
County supervisors in Wisconsin
Republican Party Wisconsin state senators
1856 births
1933 deaths